George Gibbs (18 July 1937 – 15 December 2020) was a British special effects artist who is best known for his work in Indiana Jones and the Temple of Doom, Who Framed Roger Rabbit and Indiana Jones and the Last Crusade.

Biography
Gibbs was born in Islington, London in 1937. In 1953, Gibbs started his career at his local theatre, the Hackney Empire in East London where he trained as a theatre electrician with Strand Electric Company. He worked in this line for 5 years until 1958, when he landed a job at Pinewood Film Studios.

He died on 15 December 2020.

Oscar history
All these were for Best Visual Effects:

1984 Academy Awards-Indiana Jones and the Temple of Doom, award shared with Michael J. McAlister, Dennis Muren and Lorne Peterson. Won.
1988 Academy Awards-Who Framed Roger Rabbit, award shared with Edward Jones, Ken Ralston and Richard Williams. Won.
1992 Academy Awards-Alien³, nomination shared with Richard Edlund, Alec Gillis, Tom Woodruff Jr. Lost to Death Becomes Her.

Selected filmography

Doom (2005)
The League of Extraordinary Gentlemen (2003)
From Hell (2001)
The Man in the Iron Mask (1998)
The Saint (1997)
101 Dalmatians (1996)
First Knight (1995)
Alien³ (1992)
Patriot Games (1992)
Indiana Jones and the Last Crusade (1989)
Who Framed Roger Rabbit (1988)
Labyrinth (1986)
Brazil (1985)
Indiana Jones and the Temple of Doom (1984)
Curse of the Pink Panther (1983)
Monty Python's The Meaning of Life (1983)
Conan the Barbarian (1982)
Trail of the Pink Panther (1982)
Flash Gordon (1980)

References

External links

1937 births
2020 deaths
Best Visual Effects Academy Award winners
Best Visual Effects BAFTA Award winners
Special effects people